Henry Aylmer (April 25, 1843 – July 28, 1918) was a Canadian soldier and politician.

Born in Melbourne, Canada East, the son of Udolphus Aylmer, 7th Baron Aylmer and Mary Journeaux, Aylmer was educated at the High School of Montreal and the Royal Naval College in Portsmouth, England. He served in the Canadian militia during the Fenian raids and was a lieutenant in the Royal Marine Artillery. He organized the Richmond Field Battery in 1876 and held command until November 1887, when he retired with rank of lieutenant-colonel.

In 1870, he married Louisa Blanche Fanny, a daughter of Dr H. A. Howe, Rector of Montreal High School. Aylmer practised law in his home town of Melbourne. He was first elected to the House of Commons of Canada for the electoral district of Richmond—Wolfe in an 1874 by-election. A Liberal, he was elected in the 1874 federal election. He was defeated in 1878 and again in 1896. Aylmer died in Lennoxville at the age of 75.

Electoral record

See also
 Baron Aylmer

References

1843 births
1918 deaths
High School of Montreal alumni
Liberal Party of Canada MPs
Members of the House of Commons of Canada from Quebec
People from Estrie
Younger sons of barons